Sędzice may refer to the following places in Poland:
Sędzice, Lower Silesian Voivodeship (south-west Poland)
Sędzice, Łódź Voivodeship (central Poland)
Sędzice, Warmian-Masurian Voivodeship (north Poland)